Finisar Corporation is a manufacturer of optical communication components and subsystems. 

The company was founded in April 1987 by Frank Levinson and Jerry Rawls in Menlo Park, California. In November 1999, it went public via an initial public offering. In 2008 Finisar merged with Optium Corporation. In September 2019, Finisar was acquired by II-VI Incorporated for US$3.2 billion.

Finisar's products include optical transceivers, optical engines, active optical cables, optical components, optical instrumentation, ROADM & wavelength management, optical amplifiers, and RF-over-Fiber. Their products enable high-speed voice, video, and data communications for networking, storage, wireless, and cable TV applications.

Partnerships 
Apple Inc. announced a new partnership with Finisar in December 2017. The planned investment of $390 million will support Finisar's increase production of its R&D spending and high-volume production of vertical-cavity surface-emitting lasers that power some of Apple's features such as the Face ID. The plant, supporting more than 500 jobs, is located in Sherman, Texas.

References

External links

 Companies based in Sunnyvale, California
 Networking hardware companies
 Optics manufacturing companies
 Companies formerly listed on the Nasdaq
1987 establishments in California
1999 initial public offerings
2019 mergers and acquisitions